Kaagvere is a village in Kastre Parish, Tartu County in eastern Estonia.

See also
JK Luunja

References

 

Villages in Tartu County